Sir Peter Ingram Walters (born 11 March 1931) is a retired British businessman. He is a former CEO and chairman of British Petroleum.  He was born in Birmingham, United Kingdom, in the family of a police inspector.

In 1949, he left King Edward's School, Birmingham. He gained a Bachelor of Commerce degree from the University of Birmingham in 1952.

In 1954 he joined British Petroleum. In 1965–1967 Walters served as vice president of BP North America Inc., and in 1971–1980 as BP's regional director for the Western Hemisphere, Australasia and the Far East. He became BP's deputy chairman in 1980.

Walters was British Petroleum chairman from 1981 to 1990.  He retired from British Petroleum in March 1990. In 1991–1994, he served as chairman of Midland Bank. In 1994–200, he was chairman of SmithKline Beecham. He is a former Deputy Chairman of GlaxoSmithKline.  Walters was deputy chairman of EMI in 1990–1999 and HSBC Holdings in 1992–2001.  In addition, he is a former president of the General Council of British Shipping, the Society of Chemical Industry and the Institute for Employment Studies, and has served as a chairman of the governing body of the London Business School, president of the Institute of Directors, president of the Police Foundation, president of the Institute of Business Ethics and a trustee of the Institute of Economic Affairs.

Walters was knighted in 1984.  He was awarded the Society of Chemical Industry's Centenal Medal, an Honorary Fellowship from the Royal Society of Chemistry, an Honorary Fellowship from the Institution of Chemical Engineers, and the Cadman Medal from the Institute of Petroleum.  He has received an Honorary Doctorate of Social Science from Birmingham University, the Honorary Degree of Doctor of Stirling University, and an Honorary Fellowship from the London Business School.

References

Living people
1931 births
British businesspeople in the oil industry
BP people
Businesspeople awarded knighthoods
Knights Bachelor
Alumni of the University of Birmingham